The 2021 Bretagne World RX of Lohéac was the third round of the eighth season of the FIA World Rallycross Championship. The event was held at the Circuit de Lohéac in the Lohéac commune of Bretagne.

World RX1 Championship 

Source

Heats

Semi-finals 

 Semi-Final 1

 Note: Johan Kristoffersson missed the Final race start cut-off by gearbox failure, so first reserve driver Kevin Abbring took his place.

 Semi-Final 2

Final

Standings after the event 

Source

 Note: Only the top six positions are included.

References 

|- style="text-align:center"
|width="35%"|Previous race:2021 World RX of Sweden
|width="40%"|FIA World Rallycross Championship2021 season
|width="35%"|Next race:2021 World RX of Riga
|- style="text-align:center"
|width="35%"|Previous race:2019 World RX of France
|width="40%"|World RX of France
|width="35%"|Next race:-
|- style="text-align:center"

France
World RX of France